Emmanuel Koum (5 January 1946 – 26 November 2008) was a Cameroonian former professional football striker. 
He played for Oryx Douala, Grenoble, Monaco, Arles, Chaumont and Moulins.

References

1946 births
2008 deaths
Footballers from Douala
Association football forwards
Cameroonian footballers
Cameroonian expatriate footballers
Cameroon international footballers
Grenoble Foot 38 players
AS Monaco FC players
AC Arlésien players
AS Moulins players
Ligue 1 players
Ligue 2 players
Cameroonian expatriate sportspeople in France
Expatriate footballers in France
Expatriate footballers in Monaco
1970 African Cup of Nations players
Cameroonian expatriate sportspeople in Monaco